Anak ng Lupa is a 1987 Philippine action film directed by Manuel "Fyke" Cinco. The film stars Bong Revilla as the title role.

Cast
 Bong Revilla as Hector
 Pinky Amador as Noemi
 Lani Mercado as Miriam
 Michael de Mesa as Ariosto
 Dante Rivero as Nestong Antok
 Rosemarie Gil as Mrs. Torres
 Perla Bautista as Nana Tale
 Ruben Rustia as Lolo Martin
 Dick Israel as Eric
 Joonee Gamboa as Medes
 Julio Diaz as Jim

Reception
Justino Dormiendo of the Manila Standard gave Anak ng Lupa a negative review. He criticizes the film for the lack of insight, as well as the uneven performances of the main and supporting characters attributed from Rene Villanueva's script. He cites the film's cinematography and editing as its only good points.

References

External links

1987 films
1987 action films
Filipino-language films
Philippine action films
Viva Films films
Films directed by Manuel Cinco